is a Japanese former professional boxer who competed from 2003 to 2015. He is a three-weight world champion, having held the WBA light-flyweight title from 2006 to 2007, the WBC and lineal flyweight titles from 2009 to 2010, and the WBA (Regular) bantamweight title twice between 2010 and 2013. His younger brothers, Daiki and Tomoki, are also professional boxers.

Amateur career 
Back in 2000 when Kameda was only 14 years old, Kameda managed to get some national attention by taking on former two time division world champion, Hiroki Ioka, in a 2 round exhibition match. Ioka was the inaugural WBC minimumweight champion and was also the former WBA light flyweight champion, a title which Kameda himself would controversially win in August 2006. Kameda at first was believed to have got a first round knockdown on the former champion by landing a left straight and a right hook, but the referee ruled it as a slip. Kameda throughout the exhibition bout, would try to go for a knockout. However, the fight went the distance and this would jump start Kameda by going all out on the former champion.

Professional career 
On August 2, 2006, in his first attempt for the world title, Kameda squared off with Juan Jose Landaeta of Venezuela in Yokohama, Japan, for the World Boxing Association light flyweight title. The fight was rather controversial as Kameda won the fight in a split decision despite getting knocked down in the first round and being dominated in the final two rounds. Further fueling controversy was the fact that the Korean judge who scored the fight 114-113 in Kameda's favor gave the final round to Kameda 10-9, although the perception by most observers was that the clearly exhausted Japanese boxer did nothing but tie up his opponent and try to avoid being knocked out in that round. If the Korean judge had scored the final round in favor of Landaeta, the Venezuelan would have won the bout. The match reinforced the existence of a home field advantage and the bias a foreign fighter must face when fighting on Japanese soil.

There were mixed reactions from the Japanese public after the fight. Some 50,000 calls complaining against the decision were made to TBS (Tokyo Broadcasting System, the station that broadcast the fight) to complain about the decision. While some hailed the 19-year-old's aggressiveness and impressive technique, others believed Landaeta was obviously the better fighter and exposed Kameda's inexperience and questionable stamina. Despite the controversial nature of the decision, it was a close, bitterly contested bout. Scoring some of the very close earlier rounds for Kameda would give the young fighter the necessary buffer on the scorecards to required to win, despite Landaeta's late charge. Kameda's father and trainer's backlash against the critics went as far as death threats.

Rematch and defending the title 
On December 20, 2006, in a highly anticipated rematch, Kameda decisively defeated Juan Jose Landaeta at Ariake Colosseum in Tokyo, Japan. Kameda employed a rather different boxing style from the one he used back in the title match on August. Kameda outboxed Landaeta for most of the match using his quickness and accuracy, and won by unanimous decision.

Kameda vacated his Light Flyweight Championship to move up to the Flyweight division on January 22, 2007.

Winning the World flyweight title 
Koki Kameda beat Daisuke Naito on November 29, 2009 for the WBC and lineal flyweight championships.

Defending against Pongsaklek Wonjongkam 
On March 27, 2010, Koki Kameda fought Wonjongkam to unify the WBC Flyweight championship and interim WBC Flyweight championship. The winner would also claim the vacant The Ring's Flyweight championship. Wonjongkam defeated Kameda by a 12 round majority decision to become the WBC, The Ring and Lineal Flyweight champion.

WBA Bantamweight title 
On December 26, 2010 Kameda went up to the Bantamweight weight class and fought Alexander Munoz of Venezuela for the vacant WBA Bantamweight Regular Title. Kameda defeated Munoz by unanimous decision to win the title.
In May 2012, Kameda status was changed to "Champion in Recess", as he claimed an injury that prevented him from fighting mandatory contender and Interim Champion Hugo Ruiz. Kameda was restored to Champion in November 2012, but vacated his title in December 2013, following a call for a unification match with WBA Super Champion Anselmo Moreno, in order to move down to the super flyweight division.

Professional boxing record 

{|class="wikitable" style="text-align:center"
|-
!
!Result
!Record
!Opponent
!Type
!Round, time
!Date
!Location
!Notes
|-
|35
|Loss
|33–2
|style="text-align:left;"| Kohei Kono
|UD
|12
|Oct 16, 2015
|style="text-align:left;"| 
|style="text-align:left;"|
|-
|34
|Win
|33–1
|style="text-align:left;"| Omar Salado
|KO
|4 (10), 
|Nov 1, 2014
|style="text-align:left;"| 
|
|-
|33
|Win
|32–1
|style="text-align:left;"| Jung-Oh Son
|SD
|12
|Nov 19, 2013
|style="text-align:left;"| 
|style="text-align:left;"|
|-
|32
|Win
|31–1
|style="text-align:left;"| John Mark Apolinario
|UD
|12
|Jul 23, 2013
|style="text-align:left;"| 
|style="text-align:left;"|
|-
|31
|Win
|30–1
|style="text-align:left;"| Panomroonglek Kratingdaenggym
|SD
|12
|Apr 7, 2013
|style="text-align:left;"| 
|style="text-align:left;"|
|-
|30
|Win
|29–1
|style="text-align:left;"| Hugo Ruiz
|SD
|12
|Dec 4, 2012
|style="text-align:left;"| 
|style="text-align:left;"|
|-
|29
|Win
|28–1
|style="text-align:left;"| Noldi Manakane
|UD
|12
|Apr 4, 2012
|style="text-align:left;"| 
|style="text-align:left;"|
|-
|28
|Win
|27–1
|style="text-align:left;"| Mario Macias
|TKO
|4 (12), 
|Dec 7, 2011
|style="text-align:left;"| 
|style="text-align:left;"|
|-
|27
|Win
|26–1
|style="text-align:left;"| David De La Mora
|UD
|12
|Aug 31, 2011
|style="text-align:left;"| 
|style="text-align:left;"|
|-
|26
|Win
|25–1
|style="text-align:left;"| Daniel Diaz
|RTD
|11 (12), 
|May 7, 2011
|style="text-align:left;"| 
|style="text-align:left;"|
|-
|25
|Win
|24–1
|style="text-align:left;"| Alexander Muñoz
|UD
|12
|Dec 26, 2010
|style="text-align:left;"| 
|style="text-align:left;"|
|-
|24
|Win
|23–1
|style="text-align:left;"| Cecilio Santos
|KO
|4 (10), 
|Jul 25, 2010
|style="text-align:left;"| 
|
|-
|23
|Loss
|22–1
|style="text-align:left;"| Pongsaklek Wonjongkam
|
|12
|Mar 27, 2010
|style="text-align:left;"| 
|style="text-align:left;"|
|-
|22
|Win
|22–0
|style="text-align:left;"| Daisuke Naito
|UD
|12
|Nov 29, 2009
|style="text-align:left;"| 
|style="text-align:left;"|
|-
|21
|Win
|21–0
|style="text-align:left;"| Humberto Pool
|KO
|5 (10), 
|Sep 5, 2009
|style="text-align:left;"| 
|
|-
|20
|Win
|20–0
|style="text-align:left;"| Dolores Osorio
|KO
|2 (10), 
|Mar 4, 2009
|style="text-align:left;"| 
|
|-
|19
|Win
|19–0
|style="text-align:left;"| Salvador Montes
|UD
|12
|Aug 30, 2008
|style="text-align:left;"| 
|style="text-align:left;"|
|-
|18
|Win
|18–0
|style="text-align:left;"| Marino Montiel
|TKO
|2 (10), 
|Jul 12, 2008
|style="text-align:left;"| 
|
|-
|17
|Win
|17–0
|style="text-align:left;"| Rexon Flores
|UD
|10
|Mar 22, 2008
|style="text-align:left;"| 
|
|-
|16
|Win
|16–0
|style="text-align:left;"| Cesar Lopez
|UD
|10
|Jul 28, 2007
|style="text-align:left;"| 
|
|-
|15
|Win
|15–0
|style="text-align:left;"| Irfan Ogah
|TKO
|8 (10), 
|May 23, 2007
|style="text-align:left;"| 
|
|-
|14
|Win
|14–0
|style="text-align:left;"| Everardo Morales
|UD
|10
|Mar 24, 2007
|style="text-align:left;"| 
|
|-
|13
|Win
|13–0
|style="text-align:left;"| Juan Jose Landaeta
|UD
|12
|Dec 20, 2006
|style="text-align:left;"| 
|style="text-align:left;"|
|-
|12
|Win
|12–0
|style="text-align:left;"| Juan Jose Landaeta
|
|12
|Aug 2, 2006
|style="text-align:left;"| 
|style="text-align:left;"|
|-
|11
|Win
|11–0
|style="text-align:left;"| Carlos Fajardo
|TKO
|2 (10), 
|May 5, 2006
|style="text-align:left;"| 
|
|-
|10
|Win
|10–0
|style="text-align:left;"| Carlos Bouchan
|KO
|6 (10), 
|Mar 8, 2006
|style="text-align:left;"| 
|
|-
|9
|Win
|9–0
|style="text-align:left;"| Noel Arambulet
|
|7 (10), 
|Nov 26, 2005
|style="text-align:left;"| 
|
|-
|8
|Win
|8–0
|style="text-align:left;"| Wanmeechok Singwancha
|
|3 (12), 
|Aug 21, 2005
|style="text-align:left;"| 
|style="text-align:left;"|
|-
|7
|Win
|7–0
|style="text-align:left;"| Saman Sorjaturong
|KO
|1 (10), 
|Jun 20, 2005
|style="text-align:left;"| 
|
|-
|6
|Win
|6–0
|style="text-align:left;"| Yodkeng Singwangcha
|KO
|1 (10), 
|Feb 21, 2005
|style="text-align:left;"| 
|
|-
|5
|Win
|5–0
|style="text-align:left;"| Nopadetchlek Chuwatana
|KO
|2 (10), 
|Dec 13, 2004
|style="text-align:left;"| 
|
|-
|4
|Win
|4–0
|style="text-align:left;"| Daochai KT Gym
|
|10
|Sep 27, 2004
|style="text-align:left;"| 
|
|-
|3
|Win
|3–0
|style="text-align:left;"| Saming Twingym
|KO
|1 (8), 
|May 22, 2004
|style="text-align:left;"| 
|
|-
|2
|Win
|2–0
|style="text-align:left;"| Prakan Twingym
|KO
|1 (6), 
|Mar 13, 2004
|style="text-align:left;"| 
|
|-
|1
|Win
|1–0
|style="text-align:left;"| Dennarong Sithsoba
|
|1 (6), 
|Dec 21, 2003
|style="text-align:left;"| 
|

Criticism 
Kameda is often criticized for his flamboyance, immaturity, and lack of respect both inside and outside the ring. He has never spoken courteously towards anyone in his numerous TV appearances, (considering that the Japanese language has tenses specifically used for courteous speech) and often taunts opponents with insulting presents and language. Criticism also revolves around his boxing skills and sportsmanship. The fact that Kameda's first six opponents had a combined record of 0-18 brought much criticism during the early part of his professional career. Many Japanese boxers, including former WBC Super flyweight champion Masamori Tokuyama and WBC Minimumweight title Eagle Kyowa, have stated that they could easily defeat Kameda if given a chance, and that his boasting and popularity are greatly out of proportion with his actual skills in the ring.

There was an outcry from the Japanese public about his first bout against Landaeta being fixed. Former world champions Guts Ishimatsu and Yasuei Yakushiji have commented that they believe Kameda lost the fight.

He was also involved in the controversy surrounding his brother Daiki during his fight with Daisuke Naito. Koki escaped with a warning about advising Daiki to elbow Naito in the eye. His brother was suspended from fighting for one year and his father was suspended indefinitely for the incident.

It was originally rumored and intended that Kameda would fight then WBC Light Flyweight title holder, Brian Viloria, in a WBA/WBC unification title fight. However, Kameda's controversial decision over Landaeta in the first match and Viloria losing to Omar Nino made the match difficult to produce further talks.

Naniwa is a former designation of Osaka. The nickname denotes "The Fighting Fist of Osaka", though it is sometimes derided by his anti-fans as "浪速の逃犬" (pronounced the same as the original one), which means the run-away dog of Osaka.

See also 
List of flyweight boxing champions
List of WBA world champions
List of WBC world champions
Notable boxing families
List of Japanese boxing world champions
Boxing in Japan

References

External links 
 
 Kōki Kameda - CBZ Profile

1986 births
Living people
Sportspeople from Osaka
World Boxing Association champions
World Boxing Council champions
World bantamweight boxing champions
World flyweight boxing champions
World light-flyweight boxing champions
World boxing champions
Bantamweight boxers
Flyweight boxers
Light-flyweight boxers
Southpaw boxers
Japanese male boxers